The Sauer S 2400 UL is a 4 stroke aircraft engine for homebuilt and ultralight aircraft.

Design and development
The engine is based on the Volkswagen air-cooled engine or the Wasserboxer. It is extensively modified for aircraft use and all the parts are custom made. The engine is derived from the certified engines produced by the same manufacturer and used in several motorgliders and small aircraft.

The engine can be delivered with aluminium or magnesium casing (Wasserboxer-casing or the casing from the beetle engine), where the aluminium casing weighs 7 kg more.

Applications
Groppo Trial

Specifications (variant)

See also
 Sauer engines

References

External links

S2400UL